The All-NBA G League Team is an annual NBA G League (G League) honor bestowed on the best players in the league following every G League season. The voting is conducted by the league's head coaches. The team has been selected in every season of the league's existence, dating back to its inaugural season in 2001–02. The All-NBA Development League Team is composed of three five-man lineups—a first, second, and third team, typically comprising a total of 15 roster spots. The All-NBA Development League Team originally had two teams, but was expanded to three teams in 2007–08.

Players receive five points for a first team vote, three points for a second team vote, and one point for a third team vote. The five players with the highest point totals make the first team, with the next five making the second team and so forth. In the case of a tie at the fifth position of any team, the roster is expanded. If the first team consists of six players due to a tie, the second team will still consist of five players with the potential for more expansion in the event of additional ties. Omar Cook, Will Conroy, Blake Ahearn, Jerel McNeal, Quinn Cook and Johnathan Motley hold the record for the most total selections with three apiece.

Selections

2001–02 to 2006–07

2007–08 to present

See also
All-NBA Team

References

External links
D-League All-NBDL Teams at basketball-reference.com

NBA G League awards and honors
National Basketball Association lists
Awards established in 2002
2002 establishments in the United States